Warrant Officer Gary Wilcox is a retired Royal Air Force (RAF) airman. He was the Chief of the Air Staff's Warrant Officer from 2009 to 2012, and therefore the senior RAF other rank during that time.

Military career
Wilcox entered training at RAF Halton as an apprentice in October 1974, as part of entry number 124. During his training he represented the RAF in football and athletics. His first posting after graduation was to RAF Scampton to work on Vulcan bombers. In 1978, he was promoted to corporal and attained a Higher National Certificate in Mechanical Engineering.

Wilcox was promoted to sergeant in 1981 and posted to No. 33 Squadron, RAF Odiham. From here he was detached to Belize, Northern Ireland, Portugal, Turkey, and Norway. While posted to Norway he was injured in a crash while flying in a Gazelle. In 1983, he was posted to No. 230 Squadron, RAF Gütersloh, Germany.

In 1986 Wilcox was promoted to Chief Technician and posted to 1 Air Maintenance Squadron at RAF Abingdon where he worked on Jaguars.

Personal life
Wilcox's wife, Sheena, is a Career Guidance Resettlement Consultant for the British military. They have a daughter called Freya.

References

Royal Air Force airmen
Living people
Year of birth missing (living people)
Warrant Officers of the Royal Air Force